Nora Trinler Bajčíková (31 December 1966 — 2014) was a Slovak professional tennis player.

Bajčíková, as a representative of Czechoslovakia, was a women's doubles semi-finalist at the 1987 Summer Universiade in Zagreb, partnering Iva Budařová. From the early 1990s she began competing under her married name Nora Kovarcikova. She had career high rankings of 350 in singles and 199 in doubles. Her daughter Lucia Kovarcikova is also a professional tennis player.

ITF finals

Singles: 4 (1–3)

Doubles: 13 (5–8)

References

External links
 
  (duplicate profile)

1966 births
2014 deaths
Czechoslovak female tennis players
Slovak female tennis players
Universiade silver medalists for Czechoslovakia
Universiade medalists in tennis
Medalists at the 1987 Summer Universiade
Slovak expatriate sportspeople in Switzerland